Meyer Township is a civil township of Menominee County in the U.S. state of Michigan. The population was 1,036 at the 2000 census. Hermansville is an unincorporated village within the township, and is where most of the population is concentrated.

Geography

Demographics
As of the census of 2000, there were 1,036 people, 440 households, and 285 families residing in the township. The population density was 11.5 per square mile (4.5/km2). There were 609 housing units at an average density of 6.8 per square mile (2.6/km2). The racial makeup of the township was 98.55% White, 0.10% African American, 0.68% Native American, 0.19% from other races, and 0.48% from two or more races. Hispanic or Latino of any race were 1.25% of the population.

There were 440 households, out of which 29.1% had children under the age of 18 living with them, 53.2% were married couples living together, 7.3% had a female householder with no husband present, and 35.2% were non-families. 30.7% of all households were made up of individuals, and 17.7% had someone living alone who was 65 years of age or older. The average household size was 2.35 and the average family size was 2.96.

In the township the population was spread out, with 24.8% under the age of 18, 5.4% from 18 to 24, 27.4% from 25 to 44, 22.8% from 45 to 64, and 19.6% who were 65 years of age or older. The median age was 40 years. For every 100 females, there were 102.3 males. For every 100 females age 18 and over, there were 98.7 males.

The median income for a household in the township was $33,466, and the median income for a family was $41,250. Males had a median income of $29,750 versus $17,443 for females. The per capita income for the township was $15,256. About 4.8% of families and 8.3% of the population were below the poverty line, including 7.6% of those under age 18 and 13.7% of those age 65 or over.

History 
The village of Hermansville was founded in 1878 by Mr. C.J.L. Meyer of Fond du Lac, Wisconsin who built and operated a saw and shingle mill utilizing the abundant native cedar and pine growing in the area. In 1883 Mr. Meyer organized the Wisconsin Land & Lumber Company, which acquired the mill and landholdings, and began working on methods of utilizing the abundant hardwood timber on the surrounding lands held by the company. The company eventually developed innovative new methods and machinery for manufacturing pre-cut maple wood flooring; previous techniques for cutting and shaping maple in the US were laborious and inefficient because of the hard, brittle nature of maple wood.  The IXL brand of flooring became a popular choice for flooring, due to its virtually indestructible nature and its rich color and grain.  The company also utilized other varieties of wood growing in the area for various products.

A thriving company town grew quickly as the mill prospered, with over 200 company-owned dwellings built for employees and their families. A passenger rail depot, general stores, taverns, a bank, library and post office were established, as was a multi-grade public school. Other industry developed in the area as well, aided by the town's proximity to abundant rail freight service and local natural resources.

The town's growth slowed and eventually declined, due to the rapid deforestation and subsequent scarcity of the timber that drove Hermansville's economy. Starting in the 1920s the IXL Company began selling off the  individual dwellings and parcels of land on the village property - mostly to the employees who inhabited them. The village population dropped significantly, and most of the small businesses which catered to local people were eventually closed. By the end of World War II the village's homes were all privately owned, and the IXL Company ceased all operations in Meyer Township by the end of the 1960s. The village of Hermansville now serves as the Township seat.

Recreation and Places of Interest
As an aid to transport of lumber and for recreational and domestic purposes, a small creek that intersects the village was dammed in the early 20th century, creating a reservoir named Hermansville Pond. The lake is divided into two parts by a raised rail line, and is visually distinct, as hundreds of tree stumps from trees cut down long ago jut up from the lake bottom. A public sand beach with restrooms is located at the west end of First Street, with public restrooms and a pavilion. The reservoir is currently being improved and, after being diverted and drained in 2006 for stump removal and railroad improvement issues, was dammed and refilled in the spring of 2008.

The IXL Historic Museum, dedicated to the area's early history as a company town is located in the heart of the village. The main exhibits of the museum are housed in the well-preserved office building of the Wisconsin Land & Lumber Company, a fine example of Queen Anne architecture completed in 1883. One of the most popular stops on the museum tour is at the perfectly preserved main office, which has changed little over the past 100 years. Other buildings on the museum grounds, most relocated from other locations and restored, are also part of the tour – including an early company (worker) house, a railroad depot, and a vast collection of antique turn-of-the-century machinery. The museum and its gift shop are open daily during the summer, and is available for tours at other times of the year by appointment.

The Thomas St. Onge Vietnam Veterans Museum is located in the town's center, and features exhibits pertaining to the Vietnam War. A decommissioned UH-1 "Huey" helicopter is on permanent display at the site, as well as a full Battle Tank which served in the war. The museum is sponsored by Vietnam Veterans of America, Thomas St. Onge Chapter 571, and is open afternoons daily during the summer.

The village in its entirety is notable for its unique history as a company town, and although the population declined significantly throughout the 20th century and most of the central businesses are closed, many of the original structures and homes remain, and the village looks much as it did in the early 20th century. According to author and historian Kathryn Eckert, Hermansville is "one of the state's best examples of a wood products company town."

References

External links 
 The Woodtick Music Festival
 IXL Museum official Website 
 Thomas St. Onge Vietnam Veterans Museum
 Wild Pines Golf Course
 WM Anderson Sport & Recreation Club

Townships in Menominee County, Michigan
Marinette micropolitan area
Company towns in Michigan
Townships in Michigan